Wilfred Crompton (1 April 1908 – 1971) was an English professional footballer who played as an outside forward. He played in the Football League with Blackburn Rovers, Burnley, Gillingham and Luton Town.

References

1908 births
1971 deaths
Date of death missing
Place of death missing
Footballers from Blackburn
English footballers
Association football outside forwards
Blackburn Rovers F.C. players
Burnley F.C. players
Gillingham F.C. players
Luton Town F.C. players
English Football League players